Gary Walter Doak (February 25, 1946 – March 25, 2017) was a Canadian-American National Hockey League defenceman who played for the Detroit Red Wings, Boston Bruins, Vancouver Canucks and New York Rangers. He recorded 23 goals and 107 assists for a total of 130 points in 789 NHL regular season games. With the Bruins he won the Stanley Cup in 1970. Doak was also the first player selected by the Canucks when they joined the NHL in 1970, selected second in the 1970 NHL Expansion Draft. Following retirement, Doak was the Boston Bruins' assistant coach from 1981–82 to the 1984–85 season. He also coached at the University of Massachusetts Boston for two years.

Doak died on March 25, 2017 at the age of 71 in Lynnfield, Massachusetts.

Career statistics

Regular season and playoffs

References

External links

1946 births
2017 deaths
Boston Bruins coaches
Boston Bruins players
Canadian ice hockey defencemen
Detroit Red Wings players
Hamilton Red Wings (OHA) players
Ice hockey people from Ontario
New York Rangers players
Oklahoma City Blazers (1965–1977) players
People from Goderich, Ontario
Pittsburgh Hornets players
Stanley Cup champions
Vancouver Canucks players
Deaths from cancer in Massachusetts
Canadian expatriate ice hockey players in the United States
Canadian ice hockey coaches